This is a list of fighter aces in World War II from Germany. A flying ace or fighter ace is a military aviator credited with shooting down five or more enemy aircraft during aerial combat. It is relatively certain that 2,500 German fighter pilots attained ace status, having achieved at least five aerial victories.

German day and night fighter pilots claimed roughly 70,000 aerial victories during World War II, over 25,000 British or American and over 45,000 Soviet aircraft. 103 German fighter pilots each shot down 100 or more enemy aircraft, for a total of approximately 15,400 victories. Approximately 360 German fighter pilots shot down from 40 to 99 enemy aircraft for a total of approximately 21,000 victories. Approximately 500 German fighter pilots shot down from 20 to 39 enemy aircraft for a total of approximately 15,000 victories. These achievements were honored with 453 German day fighter pilots and Zerstörer (destroyer) fighter pilots and 85 German night fighter pilots (including 14 crew members), for a total of 538 German fighter pilots, receiving the Knight's Cross of the Iron Cross.

German losses, on the other hand, were very high as well. Roughly 12,000 German day fighter pilots were killed or are still missing in action, with a further 6,000 being wounded. The Zerstörer (destroyer) pilots suffered about 2,800 casualties, either killed or missing in action, plus another 900 wounded in action. German night fighter losses were also high, in the magnitude of 3,800 pilots or crew members killed or missing and 1,400 wounded. Hans-Ulrich Rudel was the most decorated flying ace in the Luftwaffe, primarily as a ground-attack bomber pilot with over 800 vehicles destroyed in addition to his victories over opposing aircraft.

Background

There are a number of reasons why Germany's highest-scoring pilots shot down many more aircraft than the most successful Allied pilots. During the first years of the war, German day fighter pilots tended to enjoy favourable tactical circumstances; for instance, during the Battle of Britain British pilots generally tried to attack the German bombers rather than the fighters protecting them. German combat tactics during this period also tended to be superior to those of the Allies, with formation leaders in particular often having a higher chance of success.

Formal and informal Luftwaffe practices also contributed to the high numbers of victories achieved by some pilots. The normal practice in fighter units was for the highest-scoring pilot to lead formations, regardless of their rank, which placed them in the best position to shoot down Allied aircraft. The German pilots also typically conducted much more combat flying than their Allied equivalents: while the western Allied air forces frequently rested their fighter pilots or rotated them out of combat zones after a certain number of missions or flying hours, German pilots were required to fly until they became casualties.

Accuracy of claims

During the 1990s, the German archives made available to the public, including microfilm rolls of wartime records not seen since January 1945.
They show that although the Luftwaffe generally did not accept a "kill" without a witness (in which instance it was considered only a probable and didn't count in the victory scoring process), some pilots habitually submitted unwitnessed claims and these sometimes made it through the verification process, particularly if they were made by pilots with established records.
Unlike all of the other air forces that fought during World War II, the Luftwaffe did not accept shared claims, but sometimes it happened. Each claim should have referred to a particular aircraft, but some victories were awarded to other pilots who had claimed the destruction of the same aircraft.
From mid-year 1943 through 1944, the OKW communiques often overstated Allied bomber losses by a factor of up to two; these claims existed only in the communiques and weren't used in victory scoring. Defenders of the German fighter pilots maintain that overclaims were eliminated during the confirmation process, but the microfilms show that this wasn't always the case.
Stringent reviews and comparisons of Allied archives and German archives show that 90 percent of the claims submitted were confirmed, or found to be "in order" for confirmation, up to the time the system broke down altogether in 1945.

Aces

A

B

C

D

E

F

G

H

I

J

K

L

M

N

O

P

Q

R

S

T

U

V

W

Z

Pilots with more than 100 aerial victory claims
According to Obermaier, 103 Luftwaffe pilots were credited with more than 100 aerial victories. Mathews and Foreman, authors of Luftwaffe Aces – Biographies and Victory Claims, researched the German Federal Archives and list 94 Luftwaffe pilots in this category. The authors differentiate between confirmed and unconfirmed claims. In consequence the following pilots were not listed by Mathews and Foreman.
 Eberhard von Boremski, listed with at least 88 aerial victories, plus two unconfirmed claims, potentially further aerial victories with EJG 1.
 Kurt Bühligen, listed with 99 aerial victory claims, plus nine further unconfirmed claims.
 Walther Dahl, claimed at least 90 aerial victories, plus further 13 unconfirmed claims.
 Siegfried Freytag, listed with 89 aerial victories.
 Friedrich Geißhardt, listed with 93 aerial victory claims, plus eight further unconfirmed claims.
 Hartmann Grasser, listed with more than 96 aerial victory claims, plus six further unconfirmed claims.
 Kurt Tanzer, listed with at least 35 aerial victories.
 Kurt Ubben, listed with 93 aerial victory claims, plus 13 further unconfirmed claims.
 Franz Woidich, listed with 82 aerial victory claims, plus thirty further unconfirmed claims.

Additionally, Spick lists Horst-Günther von Fassong with 136 aerial victories, Rudolf Rademacher with 126 aerial victories, and Herbert Rollwage with 102 aerial victories. Further more, the US historian David T. Zabecki states that Paul-Heinrich Dähne was also credited with 100 aerial victories.

Heavy bomber aces
The Luftwaffe fighter force defended the airspace of German-occupied territory against attack, first by RAF Bomber Command and then against the United States Army Air Forces (USAAF) in the Combined Bomber Offensive. In particular, combating the Boeing B-17 Flying Fortress heavy bombers, flying in a combat box, posed a challenge to the Luftwaffe daytime fighter force. In consequence, the destruction of a heavy bomber, or the Herausschuss (separation shot)—a severely damaged heavy bomber forced to separate from its combat box which was counted as an aerial victory—was considered an exceptional achievement. In consequence, the Luftwaffe introduced a point system in 1943 which accounted for the difficulties in shooting down a heavy bomber. Although a single heavy bomber shot down or damaged still counted as one aerial victory, the accumulated points earned a fighter pilot awards, medals and promotions. The point system worked as follows:
 Three points were granted for the destruction of heavy bomber.
 Two points were earned for the Herausschuss of a heavy bomber.
 One point was awarded for the endgültige Vernichtung (final destruction), a coup de grâce inflicted on an already damaged heavy bomber.

Notes

References

Citations

Bibliography

 
 
 
 
 
 
 
 
 
 
 
 
 
 
 
 
 
 
 
 
 
 
 
 
 
 
 
 
 
 
 
 
 
 
 
 
 

Germany
Fly

Aces